Terrance Victor Harper (born January 27, 1940) is a Canadian former professional ice hockey player. Harper played in the National Hockey League from 1962 to 1981.  During this time, he played for the Montreal Canadiens, Los Angeles Kings, Detroit Red Wings,  St. Louis Blues, and Colorado Rockies.

Playing career
Harper was a classic stay-at-home defensive-oriented defenceman.  He would often total over 90 penalty minutes per season due to his physical play, but his goaltenders were very appreciative of his ability to clear offensive players out of the area in front of the goal crease.  Harper was frequently part of his teams' top penalty killing unit. Harper rarely scored, and the "Harper hat trick" was when he scored 3 goals in a season (vs. 3 in one game). He accomplished this 5 times in his 18-year career, erupting for a career high 8 goals in the 1975–76 season with the Detroit Red Wings.

Harper played his first 10 seasons with the Montreal Canadiens. While with Montreal, Harper had his greatest success, winning five Stanley Cups between 1963 and 1972.

Prior to the 1972–73 season, Harper was traded to the Los Angeles Kings, where he anchored a defence that became one of the league's stingiest. Harper was immediately named team Captain, a position he held for 3 seasons until his trade to Detroit after the 1974–75 season.

After the 1974–75 season, Harper was traded to Detroit as part of the blockbuster trade that sent hall of famer Marcel Dionne to Los Angeles. After 4 solid seasons for a struggling Red Wings team, he played his final two seasons for the St. Louis Blues and Colorado Rockies.

For his career, Harper finished with 35 goals, 221 assists, 1,362 penalty minutes, and a plus/minus total of +169 (this statistic did not become official until the 1967–68 season, Harper's 6th in the league).

Harper became the assistant coach of the Colorado Rockies in 1980–81.

Awards and achievements
Stanley Cup champion – 1965, 1966, 1968, 1969, 1971 (with Montreal)
Los Angeles Kings Team Captain, 1973 - 1975
Detroit Red Wings Team Captain, 1976

Career statistics

Regular season and playoffs

See also
List of NHL players with 1000 games played

External links
 

Note: Harper served as Red Wings captain during most of the 1975–76 season. Danny Grant was injured and out of the lineup.

1940 births
Living people
Canadian expatriate ice hockey players in the United States
Canadian ice hockey coaches
Canadian ice hockey defencemen
Colorado Rockies (NHL) coaches
Colorado Rockies (NHL) players
Detroit Red Wings captains
Detroit Red Wings players
Ice hockey people from Saskatchewan
Kansas City Red Wings players
Los Angeles Kings players
Montreal Canadiens players
National Hockey League All-Stars
Quebec Aces (AHL) players
Regina Pats players
Sportspeople from Regina, Saskatchewan
St. Louis Blues players
Stanley Cup champions